Jagual may refer to:

Places
Jagual, Patillas, Puerto Rico, a barrio
Jagual, San Lorenzo, Puerto Rico, a barrio